Thomas Belden Butler (August 22, 1806 – June 8, 1873) was a Whig politician from Connecticut. He was Chief Justice of the Connecticut Supreme Court from 1870 to 1873. He was a member of the United States House of Representatives from Connecticut's 4th congressional district from 1849 to 1851. He had previously served as a member of the Connecticut Senate representing the 12th District from 1847 to 1848. In 1848, he was President pro tempore of the Connecticut Senate. He also had served as a member of the Connecticut House of Representatives from 1832 to 1834, from 1837 to 1838, from 1843 to 1844, and from 1846 to 1847.

Early life 
Butler was born in Wethersfield, Connecticut, the son of Frederick Butler and Mary Belden. He attended the common schools. He was graduated from the medical department of Yale University in 1828 and commenced practice in Norwalk, Connecticut. Later, he studied law. He was admitted to the bar in 1837 and commenced practice in Norwalk.

Political career 
He served as member of the Connecticut House of Representatives from 1832 to 1846.

He served in the Connecticut Senate in 1847 and 1848.

Butler was elected as a Whig to the Thirty-first Congress (March 4, 1849 – March 3, 1851). He was an unsuccessful candidate for reelection in 1850 to the Thirty-second Congress.

He served as judge of the superior court in 1855.He was appointed associate justice of the State supreme court in 1861 and became chief justice of the same court in 1870.

He died in Norwalk, Connecticut, June 8, 1873. He was interred in Union Cemetery in Norwalk.

Writing
Butler was the author of The Philosophy of the Weather (1856) and The Atmospheric System Developed : a Weather Book for Practical Men (1870).

References

External links
 
 

1806 births
1873 deaths
Chief Justices of the Connecticut Supreme Court
Connecticut state senators
Members of the Connecticut House of Representatives
Politicians from Norwalk, Connecticut
People from Wethersfield, Connecticut
Presidents pro tempore of the Connecticut Senate
Yale School of Medicine alumni
Whig Party members of the United States House of Representatives from Connecticut
19th-century American politicians
Justices of the Connecticut Supreme Court
19th-century American judges